Mirgazanfer Ibragimov (Azerbaijani: Axund Mirqəzənfər İbrahimov) is the 11th Sheikh ul-Islam, akhund and the chairman of the Religious Council of the Caucasus and the only Sheikh who did not receive a religious education.

Biography 
Mirgazanfer Ibragimov was born in 1909 in the family of Mir-Alekper Ibragimov in the city of Baku, Baku Governorate of the Russian Empire. In his youth, he was more inclined towards worldly sciences, in his youth he worked for some time in the police department. Later, Sheikh al-Islam Ali-agha Suleymanzade accepted him, he successfully passed the exams and for some time served as akhund in the mosque in Quba, and later was sent as akhund to the mosque in Ganja. After that, Mirgazanfer worked as deputy chairman of the Religious Council of the Caucasus. After the death of Ali Agha Suleymanzadeh in 1976, the place of Sheikh al-Islam was empty for 2 years.

Mirgazanfer Ibragimov, who at that time was the akhund of the Goycha mosque, was nominated at the 7th Congress of Muslims of Transcaucasia convened in 1978, and was elected the new chairman of the Religious Council of the Caucasus with the title of Sheikh al-Islam.

He died in 1979 or 1980 in Baku. The Religious Council of the Caucasus entered an active period after 1980 with the election of Sheikh al-Islam Allahshukur Pashazadeh.

See also 

 The State Committee on Religious Associations of the Republic of Azerbaijan
 Allahshukur Pashazadeh

References 

1909 births
Azerbaijani Shia clerics
Azerbaijani Shia Muslims
Azerbaijani religious leaders
1979 deaths
Azerbaijani educators
Shaykh al-Islams of the Religious Council of the Caucasus